Brad Gilbert was the defending champion, but did not take part in the U.S. National Indoor tennis tournament that year.Michael Stich clinched his first career singles title in the final, defeating Wally Masur 6–7(5–7), 6–4, 7–6(7–1).

Seeds
All seeds receive a bye into the second round.

Draw

Finals

Top half

Section 1

Section 2

Bottom half

Section 3

Section 4

References

External links
 Main draw

Singles
1990 Singles